The 1990 Major League Baseball All-Star Game was the 61st playing of the midsummer classic between the all-stars of the American League (AL) and National League (NL), the two leagues comprising Major League Baseball. The game was held on July 10, 1990, at Wrigley Field in Chicago, the home of the Chicago Cubs of the National League. The game resulted in the American League defeating the National League 2–0. The game is remembered for a rain delay in the 7th inning that resulted in CBS airing Rescue 911 during the delay. This is also the first game (and, so far, the only one) to feature two players bearing the same name: Gregg Olson was a pitcher, representing the AL squad and Baltimore Orioles, while catcher Greg Olson represented the NL squad and Atlanta Braves. Outfielder Jose Canseco of the Oakland Athletics and Second Baseman Ryne Sandberg of the Chicago Cubs were the leaders of their leagues in the fan votes. 

The pregame ceremonies celebrated the 85th anniversary of the Great Lakes Naval Training Station which, as with previous All-Star Games held in Chicago, provided the colors presentation.  After Wayne Messmer sang O Canada, recording artist (and native Chicagoan) Richard Marx sang The Star-Spangled Banner.  The last All-Star Game previously held at Wrigley Field was represented by Ernie Banks who threw out the ceremonial first pitch.

The National League registered just two hits in the contest, the fewest by any team in the history of the All-Star Game.

Rosters
Players in italics have since been inducted into the National Baseball Hall of Fame.

American League

Manager: Tony La Russa, Oakland
Coaches: Jeff Torborg, Chicago White Sox, Frank Robinson, Baltimore, Jim Lefebvre, Seattle

National League

Manager: Roger Craig, San Francisco
Coaches: Jim Leyland, Pittsburgh
Don Zimmer, Chicago Cubs

Game

Umpires

Starting lineups

Game summary

All the scoring was done by the American League in a single inning.  In the top of the seventh inning, Julio Franco hit a double to right field sending Sandy Alomar home from third base and Lance Parrish home from first base.  Franco was named the game's MVP.

Footnotes and references

External links
Baseball-Reference.com
Lineups, boxscore, and more

Major League Baseball All-Star Game
All-Star Game
Baseball in Chicago
Major League Baseball All Star Game
1990 in Illinois
1990s in Chicago
July 1990 sports events in the United States
Sports competitions in Chicago